Gaudi Toka (born 17 June 1994) is a Papua New Guinean cricketer. In August 2019, he was named in Papua New Guinea's One Day International (ODI) squad for the 2019 Scotland Tri-Nation Series. He made his ODI debut for Papua New Guinea, against Oman, on 14 August 2019. Prior to his ODI debut, he was named in Papua New Guinea's squad for the 2014 Under-19 Cricket World Cup. In August 2021, Toka was named in Papua New Guinea's squad for the 2021 ICC Men's T20 World Cup.

References

External links
 

1994 births
Living people
Papua New Guinean cricketers
Papua New Guinea One Day International cricketers
Place of birth missing (living people)